Killing Kennedy is a 2013 American television film, based on the 2012 non-fiction book of the same title by Bill O'Reilly and Martin Dugard, and starring Rob Lowe, Will Rothhaar, Ginnifer Goodwin, and Michelle Trachtenberg. The movie dramatizes the presidency and assassination of John F. Kennedy, as well as the life of Lee Harvey Oswald in the years leading up to the assassination.

It premiered in the US and Canada on National Geographic Channel on November 10, 2013, followed by the various European National Geographic channels a few days later. It was first shown on terrestrial TV in the UK by Channel 4 on November 23, 2013 and in South Korea on November 21, 2013.

Plot summary
The plot follows the rise of John F. Kennedy (Lowe) as he becomes President of the United States. As Kennedy's career shapes, Lee Harvey Oswald (Rothhaar), a former marine, begins to grow disillusioned with the US. Their paths ultimately cross and results in Oswald's assassination of Kennedy.

Main cast
 Rob Lowe as John F. Kennedy
 Will Rothhaar as Lee Harvey Oswald
 Ginnifer Goodwin as Jacqueline Kennedy
 Michelle Trachtenberg as Marina Oswald
 Jack Noseworthy as Robert F. Kennedy
 Francis Guinan as Lyndon B. Johnson
 Richard Flood as Kenny O'Donnell
 Natalie Gold as Ruth Paine
 Jamie McShane as US Moscow Embassy consul Richard Edward Snyder
 Brian Hutchison as USSS Special Agent Winston Lawson
 Casey Siemaszko as Jack Ruby
 Antoinette LaVecchia as Lady Bird Johnson
 Boris McGiver as FBI Special Agent John W. Fain
 Matt Micou as J. D. Tippit
Keith Tyree as Governor John Connally
Adrienne Nelson as Nellie Connally
Lucas N Hall as Officer Atwell
Roger W. Durrett as Admiral Arleigh Burke, Chief of Naval Operations
Danny McCarthy as Agent James P. Hosty
Parker Dowling as Buell Wesley Frazier
Mike Shiflett as Captain Will Fritz
Terry Menefee Gau as Nurse Doris Nelson
Joseph Gray as Sergeant Gerald Hill
 Mary Pat Gleason as Marguerite Oswald

Production
After the success of Killing Lincoln, National Geographic Channel announced it would produce a film adaptation of Killing Kennedy. In May 2013, it was announced that Rob Lowe was to play President John F. Kennedy, Ginnifer Goodwin would play First Lady Jacqueline Kennedy, and Michelle Trachtenberg would portray Lee Harvey Oswald's wife Marina Oswald. Goodwin used intimate photos to better portray Jackie Kennedy and was concerned "to do her justice and to play her as accurately as possible without ever doing an impression of her." Costar Rob Lowe said of seeing Goodwin in the pink Chanel suit, "It made it real. If I were under any illusions about what we were doing, seeing her in that iconic moment was, I would say, sobering." While portraying Marina Oswald, Trachtenberg consulted her Russian-born mother for help in speaking Russian. Filming took place in Richmond, Virginia.

Reception
On its original airing, it drew in 3,354,000 viewers, averaging a 1.1 rating with adults in the 25-54 demographic. The viewership broke the record previously held by Killing Lincoln which averaged 3,351,000 viewers.

Critical response
Killing Kennedy received mixed reviews from both viewers and critics. On Rotten Tomatoes the series holds an approval rating of 56% based on 18 reviews, with an average of 5.9/10.  On Metacritic, it has a weighted average score of 55 out of 100, based on 13 critics, indicating "mixed or average reviews".

Awards and nominations

References

External links
 
 

2013 television films
2013 films
2013 biographical drama films
2013 crime films
American biographical drama films
American documentary television films
Cultural depictions of John F. Kennedy
Cultural depictions of Robert F. Kennedy
Cultural depictions of Jacqueline Kennedy Onassis
Cultural depictions of Lyndon B. Johnson
Cultural depictions of Lee Harvey Oswald
Cultural depictions of Jack Ruby
Films about the assassination of John F. Kennedy
Films about the Cuban Missile Crisis
Films based on non-fiction books
Films based on works by Martin Dugard (author)
Films based on works by Bill O'Reilly (political commentator)
Films directed by Nelson McCormick
Films scored by Geoff Zanelli
Films set in the 1960s
Films set in Dallas
Films set in Minsk
Films set in the White House
Films shot in Virginia
National Geographic (American TV channel) original programming
Scott Free Productions films
American drama television films
2010s English-language films
2010s American films